Daimler AG's Active Cylinder Control (ACC) is a variable displacement technology. It debuted in 2001 on the 5.8 L V12 in the CL600 and S600. Like Chrysler's later Multi-Displacement System, General Motors' Active Fuel Management and Honda's Variable Cylinder Management, it deactivates one bank of the engine's cylinders when the throttle is closed.

In order to preserve the sound of the engines, DaimlerChrysler worked with Eberspaecher to design a special exhaust system for ACC-equipped vehicles. The system uses an active valve to divert exhaust between two different exhaust systems. It also has a variable length intake manifold system to optimize output in the two modes.

Applications
 M138 V12 2001–2002

See also
 Chrysler's Multi-Displacement System (MDS)  
 General Motors' Active Fuel Management (AFM)  
 Honda's Variable Cylinder Management (VCM)
 Variable displacement

References

External links
 Ward's article

Mercedes-Benz Group
Engine technology
Automotive technology tradenames